"Ride wit Me" is a song by American rapper Nelly featuring City Spud. It was released on February 13, 2001, as the third single from Nelly's debut studio album, Country Grammar (2000). "Ride wit Me" peaked at number three on the Billboard Hot 100. Outside of the United States, "Ride Wit Me" peaked within the top 10 of the charts in Australia, Ireland, the Netherlands, Norway, and the United Kingdom.

Composition
"Ride wit Me" was written by Nelly and Jason "Jay E" Epperson and interpolates the 1982 song "I Like It" by DeBarge, so William DeBarge, Etterline Jordan, and El DeBarge were also given writing credits.

Chart performance
In the United States, "Ride wit Me" became Nelly's highest-charting single at the time, peaking at number three on the Billboard Hot 100. In the United Kingdom, "Ride wit Me" debuted and peaked at number three on the UK Singles Chart on May 13, 2001 – for the week ending date May 19, 2001 – becoming Nelly's highest-charting song in Britain until October 2002, when his duet with Kelly Rowland, "Dilemma", became his first chart-topper on the UK Singles Chart.

Music video
Largely inspired by the 1977 film Smokey and the Bandit, and also referencing the 1980s television comedy The Dukes of Hazzard and the 1967 film Cool Hand Luke, the video (directed by Marc Klasfeld) sees Nelly and Ali driving to a dilapidated bar occupied by Kyjuan, Slo-Down and Murphy Lee to throw a party. Ali drives a Peterbilt 379 truck filled with women, while Nelly drives a 1978 Pontiac Firebird Trans Am along a desert road, as the video follows their journey and eventual encounters with police, hitchhikers and other roadside incidents. The video culminates with their arrival and a party taking place outside the bar. Featured artist City Spud provides the third verse; however, due to being incarcerated, he does not appear in the music video; Nelly and the St. Lunatics lip-sync his lines. The video won Best Rap Video at the MTV Video Music Awards in 2001, also receiving a nomination for Viewer's Choice.

Track listings

UK CD single
 "Ride wit Me" (clean edit with FX)
 "Ride wit Me" (Stargate mix)
 "Come Over"
 "Ride wit Me" (video)

UK 12-inch single
A1. "Ride wit Me" (album version)
B1. "Ride wit Me" (Stargate mix)
B2. "Ride wit Me" (clean edit with FX)

European CD single
 "Ride wit Me" (clean edit with FX short) – 4:15
 "Ride wit Me" (Stargate mix) – 4:35

Australian CD single
 "Ride wit Me" (clean edit with FX short) – 4:15
 "Ride wit Me" (dirty LP version) – 4:51
 "Ride wit Me" (Stargate remix) – 4:35
 "Icey" (featuring St. Lunatics) – 4:14

Charts

Weekly charts

Year-end charts

Certifications

Release history

Covers and live performances
Nelly joined with country music duo Florida Georgia Line to perform "Ride wit Me" and the remix of their hit single "Cruise" at the 2013 American Music Awards.

Pop singer Slayyyter released a cover of the song on August 2, 2019.

References

2000 songs
2001 singles
Music videos directed by Marc Klasfeld
Nelly songs
Songs about cannabis
Songs about cars
Songs written by El DeBarge
Songs written by Jay E
Songs written by Nelly
Universal Records singles